Woodstown is a borough in Salem County, in the U.S. state of New Jersey. As of the 2020 United States census, the borough's population was 3,678, an increase of 173 (+4.9%) from the 2010 census count of 3,505, which in turn reflected an increase of 369 (+11.8%) from the 3,136 counted in the 2000 census.

Woodstown was established on July 26, 1882, from portions of Pilesgrove Township based on the results of a referendum held that same day. The borough's incorporation was confirmed on March 3, 1925. The borough was named for early settler Jackanias (or Jaconias) Wood.

Geography
According to the United States Census Bureau, the borough had a total area of 1.62 square miles (4.18 km2), including 1.58 square miles (4.08 km2) of land and 0.04 square miles (0.10 km2) of water (2.47%).

The Borough of Woodstown is an independent municipality completely surrounded by Pilesgrove Township, making it part of 21 pairs of "doughnut towns" in the state, where one municipality entirely surrounds another. Woodstown serves as the more densely settled commercial core of the paired communities, while Pilesgrove is more agricultural.

Demographics

2010 census

The Census Bureau's 2006–2010 American Community Survey showed that (in 2010 inflation-adjusted dollars) median household income was $62,958 (with a margin of error of +/− $8,239) and the median family income was $74,479 (+/− $7,727). Males had a median income of $64,688 (+/− $16,960) versus $40,781 (+/− $8,241) for females. The per capita income for the borough was $31,074 (+/− $3,576). About 3.4% of families and 8.7% of the population were below the poverty line, including 6.0% of those under age 18 and 8.5% of those age 65 or over.

2000 census
As of the 2000 United States census there were 3,136 people, 1,304 households, and 839 families residing in the borough. The racial makeup of the borough was 85.04% White, 12.91% African American, 0.19% Native American, 0.73% Asian, 0.26% from other races, and 0.86% from two or more races. Hispanic or Latino of any race were 1.56% of the population.

There were 1,304 households, out of which 30.1% had children under the age of 18 living with them, 49.5% were married couples living together, 11.5% had a female householder with no husband present, and 35.6% were non-families. 30.8% of all households were made up of individuals, and 14.5% had someone living alone who was 65 years of age or older. The average household size was 2.38 and the average family size was 3.00.

In the borough the population was spread out, with 24.7% under the age of 18, 6.9% from 18 to 24, 29.6% from 25 to 44, 22.3% from 45 to 64, and 16.5% who were 65 years of age or older. The median age was 38 years. For every 100 females, there were 87.0 males. For every 100 females age 18 and over, there were 83.8 males.

The median income for a household in the borough was $44,533, and the median income for a family was $56,328. Males had a median income of $42,175 versus $31,169 for females. The per capita income for the borough was $24,182. About 3.5% of families and 5.5% of the population were below the poverty line, including 9.0% of those under age 18 and 4.3% of those age 65 or over.

Government

Local government

Woodstown is governed under the Borough form of New Jersey municipal government, which is used in 218 municipalities (of the 564) statewide, making it the most common form of government in New Jersey. The governing body is comprised of the Mayor and the Borough Council, with all positions elected at-large on a partisan basis as part of the November general election. The Mayor is elected directly by the voters to a four-year term of office. The Borough Council is comprised of six members elected to serve three-year terms on a staggered basis, with two seats coming up for election each year in a three-year cycle. The Borough form of government used by Woodstown is a "weak mayor / strong council" government in which council members act as the legislative body with the mayor presiding at meetings and voting only in the event of a tie. The mayor can veto ordinances subject to an override by a two-thirds majority vote of the council. The mayor makes committee and liaison assignments for council members, and most appointments are made by the mayor with the advice and consent of the council.

, the Mayor of the Borough of Woodstown is Republican Don Dietrich, whose term of office ends December 31, 2023. Members of the Woodstown Borough Council are Council President Glenn Merkle (R, 2024), Heather Bobbitt (R, 2023), Jim Hackett (R, 2023), Joe Hiles (D, 2022), Bertha Hyman (D, 2022) and Kristin Nixon (R, 2024).

In March 2015, the Borough Council selected Debbie Tierno from among three candidates nominated by the Republican municipal committee to fill the vacant seat of Fran Grenier who had resigned the previous month.

Matt Perry was selected by the Borough Council in December 2013 from among three candidates offered by the Republican municipal committee to fill the vacant seat of Veronica Soultz who resigned from office the previous month after moving out of the borough.

Federal, state and county representation
Woodstown is located in the 2nd Congressional District and is part of New Jersey's 3rd state legislative district.

 

Salem County is governed by a five-member Board of County Commissioners who are elected at-large to serve three-year terms of office on a staggered basis, with either one or two seats coming up for election each year. At an annual reorganization meeting held in the beginning of January, the board selects a Director and a Deputy Director from among its members. , Salem County's Commissioners (with party, residence and term-end year listed in parentheses) are 
Director Benjamin H. Laury (R, Elmer, term as commissioner ends December 31, 2024; term as director ends 2022), 
Deputy Director Gordon J. "Mickey" Ostrum, Jr. (R, Pilesgrove Township, term as commissioner ends 2024; term as deputy director ends 2022),  
R. Scott Griscom (R, Mannington Township, 2022), 
Edward A. Ramsay (R, Pittsgrove Township, 2023) and
Lee R. Ware (D, Elsinboro Township, 2022). Constitutional officers elected on a countywide basis are 
County Clerk Dale A. Cross (R, 2024),
Sheriff Charles M. Miller (R, 2024) and 
Surrogate Nicki A. Burke (D, 2023).

Politics
As of March 2011, there were a total of 2,340 registered voters in Woodstown, of which 664 (28.4% vs. 30.6% countywide) were registered as Democrats, 573 (24.5% vs. 21.0%) were registered as Republicans and 1,099 (47.0% vs. 48.4%) were registered as Unaffiliated. There were 4 voters registered as Libertarians or Greens. Among the borough's 2010 Census population, 66.8% (vs. 64.6% in Salem County) were registered to vote, including 89.2% of those ages 18 and over (vs. 84.4% countywide).

In the 2012 presidential election, Democrat Barack Obama received 51.7% of the vote (886 cast), ahead of Republican Mitt Romney with 46.2% (792 votes), and other candidates with 2.1% (36 votes), among the 1,728 ballots cast by the borough's 2,497 registered voters (14 ballots were spoiled), for a turnout of 69.2%. In the 2008 presidential election, Democrat Barack Obama received 936 votes (52.3% vs. 50.4% countywide), ahead of Republican John McCain with 821 votes (45.8% vs. 46.6%) and other candidates with 19 votes (1.1% vs. 1.6%), among the 1,791 ballots cast by the borough's 2,340 registered voters, for a turnout of 76.5% (vs. 71.8% in Salem County). In the 2004 presidential election, Republican George W. Bush received 818 votes (50.8% vs. 52.5% countywide), ahead of Democrat John Kerry with 766 votes (47.5% vs. 45.9%) and other candidates with 11 votes (0.7% vs. 1.0%), among the 1,611 ballots cast by the borough's 2,241 registered voters, for a turnout of 71.9% (vs. 71.0% in the whole county).

In the 2013 gubernatorial election, Republican Chris Christie received 62.9% of the vote (704 cast), ahead of Democrat Barbara Buono with 34.6% (387 votes), and other candidates with 2.5% (28 votes), among the 1,132 ballots cast by the borough's 2,472 registered voters (13 ballots were spoiled), for a turnout of 45.8%. In the 2009 gubernatorial election, Republican Chris Christie received 522 votes (45.4% vs. 46.1% countywide), ahead of Democrat Jon Corzine with 489 votes (42.5% vs. 39.9%), Independent Chris Daggett with 108 votes (9.4% vs. 9.7%) and other candidates with 19 votes (1.7% vs. 2.0%), among the 1,150 ballots cast by the borough's 2,361 registered voters, yielding a 48.7% turnout (vs. 47.3% in the county).

Education

The Woodstown-Pilesgrove Regional School District serves public school students in pre-kindergarten through twelfth grade from Woodstown and Pilesgrove Township. As of the 2020–21 school year, the district, comprised of four schools, had an enrollment of 1,425 students and 126.5 classroom teachers (on an FTE basis), for a student–teacher ratio of 11.3:1. Schools in the district (with 2020–21 enrollment data from the National Center for Education Statistics) are 
William Roper Early Childhood Learning Center with 83 students in grades PreK-K, 
Mary S. Shoemaker Elementary School with 470 students in grades 1-5, 
Woodstown Middle School with 278 students in grades 6-8 and 
Woodstown High School with 579 students in grades 9-12. Students from neighboring Alloway Township, Oldmans Township and Upper Pittsgrove Township attend the high school as part of sending/receiving relationships. A majority of public school students in grades 9–12 from Oldmans Township attend Penns Grove High School as part of a sending/receiving relationship with the Penns Grove-Carneys Point Regional School District, with the balance attending Woodstown High School.

Transportation

Roads and highways

U.S. Route 40 traverses the borough roughly east to west and Route 45 roughly south to north.

Public transportation
NJ Transit provides bus service between Salem and Philadelphia on the 401 route, with local service offered on the 468 route operating between Penns Grove and Woodstown.

The  southern portion of the freight rail Salem Branch operated under contract by Southern Railroad of New Jersey runs through the borough.

Notable people

People who were born in, residents of, or otherwise closely associated with Woodstown include:

 Teyona Anderson (born 1989), winner of America's Next Top Model (season 12)
 Isaac Ambrose Barber (1852–1909), U.S. Congressman from Maryland, serving from 1897 to 1899
 Mario Cerrito, horror filmmaker
 Isaiah D. Clawson (1820–1879), represented New Jersey's 1st congressional district in the United States House of Representatives from 1855 to 1859
 Fred Drains (born 1971), American-born and naturalized Swedish basketball player
 Rachel Davis DuBois (1892–1993), educator, human rights activist and pioneer of intercultural education
 Hilly Flitcraft (1923–2003), pitcher whose MLB career consisted of three games played with the Philadelphia Phillies during the 1942 season at the age of 19
 Elwood L. Haines (1893–1949), Bishop of the Episcopal Diocese of Iowa from 1944 to 1949
 Irv Halter, retired United States Air Force major general who ran for Congress in Colorado in the 2014 elections
 Tara LaRosa (born 1978), mixed martial arts fighter
 Everett Shinn (1876–1953), realist painter best known for his work with the Ashcan School

References

External links

 Borough of Woodstown website
 Welcome to Woodstown website
 Woodstown page on Salem County website
 Woodstown-Pilesgrove Regional School District
 
 School Data for the Woodstown-Pilesgrove Regional School District, National Center for Education Statistics
 American Legion Ambulance Association

 
1882 establishments in New Jersey
Borough form of New Jersey government
Boroughs in Salem County, New Jersey
Populated places established in 1882